Kaas chante Piaf à l'Olympia is a live album/home video by French singer Patricia Kaas. It was released on 28 March 2014 as a two-disc set (DVD/CD). Kaas chante Piaf à l'Olympia contains songs originally performed by French cabaret singer Édith Piaf.

Track listing

Charts

References

2014 albums
Patricia Kaas albums